Ollerton is a civil parish in Cheshire East, England.  It contains 12 buildings that are recorded in the National Heritage List for England as designated listed buildings, all of which are at Grade II.  This grade is the lowest of the three gradings given to listed buildings and is applied to "buildings of national importance and special interest". Apart from the village of Ollerton, the parish is rural.  Other than a milepost, all the listed buildings are houses and associated structures, all but one dated before 1800.

References

Citations

Sources

 

Listed buildings in the Borough of Cheshire East
Lists of listed buildings in Cheshire